Roy Minton (born in Nottingham, England) is an English playwright best known for Scum and his other work with Alan Clarke.  He is notable for having written over 30 one-off scripts for London Weekend Television, Rediffusion, BBC, ATV, Granada, Thames Television and Yorkshire Television, including Sling Your Hook, Horace, Funny Farm, Scum, Goodnight Albert, and The Hunting of Albert Crane.

He has translated and performed several of his plays overseas and at festivals in the UK, including a reading of his play for Scum at the Royal Shakespeare Company, London; and Gradual Decline at the Riverside Studios London.

Minton also wrote the screenplay for Scrubbers, a film from which he disassociates himself totally.  During his absence overseas, he felt the original screenplay had been "savaged" and describes the final production as "...arguably the worst film ever made."

Background 
Born in Nottingham England, Minton won a two-year scholarship at the Guildhall School of Music and Drama, London.  He worked as an actor prior to writing full-time.  He was winner of  a BBC playwriting competition, received the Art Council Award and was resident dramatist at the Nottingham Playhouse.

Works

Stage Plays
 Death in Leicester
 Sometime Never
 Ag and Fish
 Good Times
 Bovver
 Funny Sunday
 Scum
 Gradual Decline

Feature films
 Scum
 Scrubbers

Radio Plays
 Working Weekend BBC
 A Kiss on the Peke Radio Telefís Éireann, Dublin.
 The Gold Medallist BBC

Films and Plays for Television
 Stand By Your Screen
 Goodnight Albert
 Horace
 Horace (tv series) 6 x 30-minute plays for Yorkshire Television based on the original BBC film.
 Funny Farm
 Scum
 Fast Hands

Further reading 
 Bovver One-act play.  Prompt Series, Hutchinson.
 Scum Novel adapted from the film script. Hutchinson/Arrow Books

Personal life 
Minton lives in north London and continues to write novels, scripts and plays.  He is currently working on his autobiography.

Awards
Arts Council Award

External links
Roy Minton’s Blog.
Scum (TV drama) at the BFI's Screenonline
625.org biography

Year of birth missing (living people)
Living people
English dramatists and playwrights
People from Nottingham
English male dramatists and playwrights